Omurice or  is a Japanese dish consisting of an omelette made with fried rice and thin, fried scrambled eggs, usually topped with ketchup. It is a popular dish also commonly cooked at home. Children in particular enjoy omurice. It is often featured in Japan's version of a children's meal, .

Etymology
With omu and raisu being derived from the Japanese pronunciation of the French word omelette and the English word rice, the name is an example of wasei-eigo.

History
Omurice is said to have originated around the turn of the 20th century at a western-style restaurant in Tokyo's Ginza district called Renga-tei, inspired by chakin-zushi.

Variations
The dish typically consists of chikin raisu(ja) (chicken rice: rice pan-fried with ketchup and chicken) wrapped in a thin sheet of fried scrambled eggs. The ingredients flavoring the rice vary. Often, the rice is fried with various meats (but typically chicken) or vegetables, and can be flavored with beef stock, ketchup, demi-glace, white sauce or simply salt and pepper. Sometimes, rice is replaced with fried noodles (yakisoba) to make omusoba. A variant in Okinawa is omutako, consisting of an omelet over taco rice. Fried hot dog and Spam are also two popular meats to include in the dish.

Similar dishes
  
A similar dish exists in Southeast Asia, especially in Malaysia, Indonesia and Singapore, and is called nasi goreng pattaya. It is a fried rice dish, covering chicken fried rice in thin fried egg or omelet.

Volga rice is another similar dish.

In popular culture

A new kind of omurice was developed for the 1985 comedy film Tampopo in collaboration with Taimeiken, a famous restaurant in Nihonbashi. This version has the rice covered with a half-cooked omelet which is cut open to spread and cover the rice. This version has become so popular that it is the restaurant standard now. Home cooks typically cook a thin omelet completely and then place it over the seasoned rice and decorate it with ketchup.

Homestyle omurice is a frequent item on maid cafe menus since the addition of ketchup allows a maid to decorate the meal easily at the table as a form of "service."

See also

 List of egg topics
 List of brunch foods
 List of Japanese foods

References

External links

 JunsKitchen. "Fluffy Omurice (Japanese Omelet Rice)", YouTube.com
 Setsuko Yoshizuka. "Omu Rice", JapaneseFood.About.com

Articles containing video clips
Fried rice
Japanese cuisine
Japanese rice dishes
Korean rice dishes
Omelettes
Wasei-eigo
Japanese egg dishes